Elena Gorohova (born 6 November 1972) is a Moldovan biathlete. She competed at the 1994, 1998 and the 2006 Winter Olympics. She also competed in the cross-country skiing at the 2002 Winter Olympics and the 2006 Winter Olympics. She was the first woman to represent Moldova at the Olympics.

References

External links
 

1972 births
Living people
Biathletes at the 1994 Winter Olympics
Biathletes at the 1998 Winter Olympics
Biathletes at the 2006 Winter Olympics
Cross-country skiers at the 2002 Winter Olympics
Cross-country skiers at the 2006 Winter Olympics
Moldovan female biathletes
Moldovan female cross-country skiers
Olympic biathletes of Moldova
Olympic cross-country skiers of Moldova
Place of birth missing (living people)